The Somali bushbaby (Galago gallarum), or the Somali lesser galago, as it is also known,  is a species of nocturnal, arboreal primate in the family Galagidae. It is found in Ethiopia, Kenya, and Somalia. It is threatened by habitat loss.

Distribution
The Somali Bushbaby is found in Kenya, Somalia and Ethiopia. Unlike other galagos, it is endemic to the thorny woodland/scrub and semi-arid thorn scrub which covers large tracts of south-western Ethiopia, Kenya (except for the coastal strip, semi-desert region east of Lake Turkana, and area east of Lake Victoria), and in Somalia from Odweina near the Red sea southward to the border with Kenya.

Taxonomy
First described by Oldfield Thomas in 1901, it was later classified as one of the many subspecies of the Senegal lesser galago Galago senegalensis. T.R. Olson, in his Ph.D. thesis in 1979, and his paper of 1986, raised it once again to the status of a separate species, which reclassification has not been disputed by other academics. The Somali lesser galago is considered to be a monotypic species, i.e. no subspecies have been defined.

Description

The galago's face and throat are whitish while the ears, eye-rings, muzzle and tail are black or dark brown providing a distinctive contrast. The galago has a pale belly with particolored hair, which is Grey for most of its length except for its tip which is buff in color, resulting in the galago looking sand-colored by day and grayish by night.

G. gallarum is sympatric with G. senegalensis but is differentiated in the measurements of hind limb, hind foot, ear and tail-length. In the field, the general appearance, call and preferred habitat aid in discriminating between them.  The Kenyan coast galago Gallagoides cocos is another species the range of which overlaps the southern margin of the Somali galago's range in Kenya and Somalia. Both these galagoes have calls distinct from that of the Somali galago and occupy moister habitats. The ears of these galagoes appear Grey and brown respectively with a pink patch visible in front of the lower ear.

References

Somali bushbaby
Mammals of Ethiopia
Mammals of Kenya
Mammals of Somalia
Somali bushbaby
Somali bushbaby
Taxonomy articles created by Polbot